The Tyldesley Top Chapel is a chapel in Tyldesley. It is a Grade II Listed building.

Top Chapel was built in 1789 on a site of 1,300 square yards at the top of Tyldesley Banks opposite the Square. The site and building materials were all provided by Thomas Johnson. It was properly known as "The Lady Huntingdon Chapel" but became known as Top Chapel because of its position at the top of Astley Street. Its first minister was J. Johnson who was ordained at Spa Fields Chapel London by the Countess of Huntingdon's Connexion.

Lady Selina Hastings, the Countess of Huntingdon had been greatly influenced by John Wesley and George Whitefield and set up the Calvinistic Connexion within the Methodist Church. The Connexion still has several chapels, mostly in the south of England.

Architecture
The chapel is constructed in Flemish bond brick. Its gabled facade is topped by a 19th-century bellcote with a single bell. A pair of panelled doors in moulded surrounds with flat hoods is separated by a Venetian style window with leaded glass. There is a similar window immediately above it and above that a roundel panel bearing the date. The side elevations have three bays, the centre bay is set slightly forward, all with round-headed windows. The rear has a gable pediment in brick relief and a blind window.

Inside, the three-sided gallery is supported on timber columns. The chapel has a plain ceiling, and 19th-century organ chamber.

See also
Listed buildings in Tyldesley

References

Citations

Bibliography

External links

Genuki, Tyldesley with Shakerley

Methodist churches in Greater Manchester
Churches in Greater Manchester
Grade II listed churches in the Metropolitan Borough of Wigan
Countess of Huntingdon's Connexion
Tyldesley